The VDS-002 was an American closed-wheel sports prototype race car, designed, developed, and built by Racing Team VDS for the revived Can-Am series, in 1983. Michael Roe won the 1984 Can-Am Championship outright in the car, and together with the VDS-004, won a total of 7 of the 10 races that season. As with most Can-Am cars of the time, it was powered by the commonly used  Chevrolet small-block motor.

References

Sports prototypes
Can-Am cars